The 2006–07 GET-ligaen season began on 7 September 2006 and ended 22 February 2007.

Regular season

Final standings
GP = Games played; W = Wins; L = Losses; T = Ties; OTW = Overtime Wins; OTL = Overtime losses; GF = Goals for; GA = Goals against; PTS = Points; (C)=ChampionsSource: hockey.no

Statistics

Scoring leaders
GP = Games played; G = Goals; A = Assists; Pts = Points; +/– = Plus/minus; PIM = Penalty minutesSource: hockey.no

Leading goaltenders
GP = Games played; Min = Minutes played; W = Wins; L = Losses; GA = Goals against; SO = Shutouts; Sv% = Save percentage; GAA = Goals against averageSource: hockey.no

Playoffs

Source: hockey.no

Promotion/Relegation
GP = Games played; W = Wins; L = Losses; T = Ties; OTW = Overtime Wins; OTL = Overtime losses; GF = Goals for; GA = Goals against; PTS = Points; (P)=PromotedSource: hockey.no

References

External links
 

GET-ligaen seasons
Norway
GET